Toby Philip Down (born 3 June 1994) is an English-born Hong Kong professional footballer who plays as a defensive midfielder or a centre back and is currently a free agent.

Club career
Down moved to Hong Kong at the age of 3 with his family. He played junior football for the Kowloon Cricket Club in the HKJFL, until moving into the local football set up with Kitchee and then Sham Shui Po. After attending secondary school in King George V School he had a trial period with Wycombe Wanderers in 2013, making 1 appearance in a pre-season friendly.

Down started his senior career at Citizen, making his senior debut in the Hong Kong FA Cup playing the last nine minutes in a 3–0 win over Sun Source.

Down then attended Concordia University to study marketing and play for the men's football team.

After four years in America, Down returned to Hong Kong to join Tai Po. On 2 September 2018, he made his Hong Kong Premier League debut for Tai Po, playing the last 20 minutes in a 4–4 draw with Yuen Long.

On 6 July 2020, Down joined fellow Hong Kong Premier League club Eastern.

On 15 October 2020, Southern acquired Down on loan for the season.

On 9 July 2022, Down left Eastern.

Personal life
Down was born in Ascot, England and has four siblings. He competed at both rugby and athletics when he was younger.

Career statistics

Club

Honours
Tai Po
Hong Kong Premier League: 2018–19

References

External links
 
 

1994 births
Living people
English footballers
Hong Kong footballers
Citizen AA players
Tai Po FC players
Eastern Sports Club footballers
Southern District FC players
Association football midfielders
Association football defenders
Hong Kong Premier League players
Hong Kong people of English descent
Footballers from Berkshire
Alumni of King George V School, Hong Kong